48th & Brighton / National Western Center station (sometimes stylized and abbrivated as 48th & Brighton•Nat'l Western Cntr) is a station on the N Line of the Denver RTD commuter rail system in Denver, Colorado. It is the first station northbound from Union Station and is located in the Elyria-Swansea neighborhood of the city. The station opened on September 21, 2020.

The station is located near the National Western Center, home of the annual National Western Stock Show.

References 

RTD commuter rail stations in Denver
Railway stations in the United States opened in 2020
2020 establishments in Colorado